Narva PSK is an ice hockey team located in Narva, Estonia, which plays in the Coolbet Hokiliiga, the top tier of ice hockey in Estonia. They play home games at the Narva Ice Hall.

History
Narva PSK were founded in 2003, following the dissolution of the previous Narva-based hockey team, Narva 2000 (formerly known as Narva Kreenholm). Since their inception, Narva PSK have been a member of the Meistriliiga, and won the league twice, in  both 2016 and 2017. As a result of winning the league in 2017, Narva PSK took place in the 2017–18 IIHF Continental Cup, where they were in the same group as HC Donbass of Ukraine, Polish side GKS Tychy and Latvian outfit HK Kurbads. Narva would ultimately lose all of their games.

Narva PSK were originally scheduled to be part of the inaugural Baltic Hockey League, however they were unable to participate as a result of the COVID-19 pandemic, and subsequently HC Everest took their place.

Roster 
Updated January 22, 2021.

Honours
Meistriliiga Championships:
 2016, 2017

Notable players
 Vjatseslav Kulpin

Notable Coaches
 Raiss Davletkildijev

References

External links
 
eestihoki.ee 

Sport in Narva
Ice hockey teams in Estonia
Meistriliiga (ice hockey)
Ice hockey clubs established in 2003
2003 establishments in Estonia